Bobby Colvin (5 December 1876 – 1 October 1940) was a Scottish footballer who played as an outside right for Liverpool, Glossop North End (1898–99), New Brighton Tower, (1899–1901), Luton Town (1901–02), Queens Park Rangers (1902–03), Swindon Town (1903-04), and Carlisle United.

References

1876 births
1940 deaths
Scottish footballers
Liverpool F.C. players
Glossop North End A.F.C. players
Luton Town F.C. players
Queens Park Rangers F.C. players
Swindon Town F.C. players
Association football outside forwards
New Brighton Tower F.C. players
Carlisle United F.C. players